is a Japanese billionaire, and the former chairman of the Benesse Corporation, a publishing firm and juku company known for its patronage of the arts.

Career
Fukutake inherited Benesse, which his father founded in 1955 as Fukutake Publishing. After his father's death in 1986, he renamed it Benesse (Latin for well-being), and expanded the company, and his family owns 15% of the company. Benesse owns 275 nursing homes in Japan and the Berlitz language schools.

Personal life
Fukutake is married, with one son, and lives in Auckland, New Zealand.

Art "shrines"
He has created four museums or "art shrines" on the islands of Naoshima, Teshima and Inujima in an archipelago in Japan's southern Seto Inland Sea, including the Chichu Art Museum. They have been built in collaboration with the architect Tadao Ando.

References 

1940s births
Year of birth missing (living people)
Living people
People from Okayama Prefecture
Waseda University alumni
Benesse
Japanese billionaires
20th-century Japanese businesspeople
21st-century Japanese businesspeople
Japanese philanthropists
Japanese art collectors
Museum founders